Woodroofe is a surname. Notable people with the surname include:
 Grace Woodroofe, Australian guitarist
 Michael Woodroofe (1940—2022), American statistician

See also
 Woodrooffe

References

Surnames of Old English origin